Hypotia littoralis is a species of snout moth in the genus Hypotia. It was described by Patrice J.A. Leraut in 2009 and is known from southern Madagascar.

References

Moths described in 2009
Hypotiini